Chet, Floyd & Boots is a studio album by American guitarist Chet Atkins, pianist Floyd Cramer and saxophone player Boots Randolph. Boots had a novelty hit with Yakety Sax which Chet covered, playing the saxophone lead on guitar, as Yakety Axe - which also became a hit. Cramer was a regular session musician at the Nashville studios, playing with a multitude of artists including Elvis Presley and Brenda Lee, helping to define the "Nashville Sound" that Atkins had also helped develop. The trio briefly toured together.

Chet, Floyd & Boots was originally released on RCA's budget label, Camden. It was also released on the Pickwick label and re-released on CD in 1992 by Special Music.

Track listing

Side one
 "Hot Mocking Bird" – 2:07 (Chet)
 "Piano Rock Roll" – 2:11  (Floyd)
 "Big Daddy" (John D. Loudermilk) – 2:03  (Boots)
 "Oh, Lonesome Me" (Don Gibson) – 2:17 (Chet)
 "Georgia on My Mind" (Stuart Gorrell, Hoagy Carmichael) – 3:41  (Floyd)

Side two
 "Yakety Sax" (Randolph, James Rich) – 1:57  (Boots)
 "From Nashville with Love" (John D. Loudermilk) – 2:41 (Chet)
 "Cast Your Fate to the Wind" (Vince Guaraldi) – 2:35  (Floyd)
 "Temptation" – 2:20  (Boots)

Personnel
Chet Atkins – guitar
Floyd Cramer – piano
Boots Randolph – saxophone

Production 
Ethel Gabriel – producer
Bob Simpson – remastering

See also
 The Nashville A-Team

References

1971 albums
Chet Atkins albums
Floyd Cramer albums
RCA Camden albums
Collaborative albums
Pickwick Records albums
Boots Randolph albums